Frontiers in Neuroendocrinology is a quarterly peer-reviewed scientific journal covering all aspects of neuroendocrinology. It was established in 1980 and is published by Elsevier. The editor-in-chief is Liisa Galea (University of British Columbia).

Abstracting and indexing 
The journal is abstracted and indexed in:

According to the Journal Citation Reports, the journal has a 2014 impact factor of 7.037.

References

External links 
 

Neuroscience journals
Endocrinology journals
Elsevier academic journals
Quarterly journals
Publications established in 1980
English-language journals